Deudorix batikeli is a butterfly in the family Lycaenidae. It is found on Madagascar. The habitat consists of forests.

References

External links
Die Gross-Schmetterlinge der Erde 13: Die Afrikanischen Tagfalter. Plate XIII 66 d as licinia

Butterflies described in 1833
Deudorigini
Deudorix